Gamma Doradus, Latinized from γ Doradus, is the third-brightest star in the southern constellation of Dorado. It is faintly visible to the naked eye with an apparent visual magnitude of approximately 4.25, and is a variable star, the prototype of the class of Gamma Doradus variables. The star is located at a distance of 67 light years from the Sun based on parallax, and is drifting further away with a radial velocity of +25 km/s. Based on its motion through space, it appears to be a member of the IC 2391 supercluster.

This is an F-type main-sequence star with a stellar classification of F1V. It is a pulsating variable that varies in brightness by less than a tenth of a magnitude owing to nonradial gravity wave oscillations. Four pulsation frequencies have been identified with periods of 17.6, 12.8, 16.3, and 18.2 hours. The star is around 0.5–1.2 billion years old and is spinning with a projected rotational velocity of 57 km/s. It has 1.6 times the mass of the Sun and 1.9 times the Sun's radius. The star is radiating seven times the luminosity of the Sun from its photosphere at an effective temperature of 6,906 K.

An infrared excess has been detected at multiple frequencies, indicating that the star is being orbited by a pair of debris disks.

References

F-type main-sequence stars
Gamma Doradus variables
Circumstellar disks

Dorado (constellation)
Doradus, Gamma
CD-51 01066
Gliese and GJ objects
027290
019893
1338
TIC objects